Hank Roberts (born March 24, 1954, Terre Haute, Indiana) is an American jazz cellist and vocalist. He plays the electric cello, and his style is a mixture of rock, jazz, avant-garde, folk, and classical influences. He emerged with the downtown New York City jazz scene of the 1980s and is associated with its post-modern tendencies.

Background
In the early 1980s, Roberts made a number of recordings for the defunct JMT label, was a featured member of the Bill Frisell Quartet, and was an important voice in many groups of saxophonist Tim Berne. Roberts also recorded three discs with the Arcado String Trio, an improvisational chamber group featuring Mark Feldman, violin, and Mark Dresser, double bass.  

In the early 1990s, Roberts left Frisell's group and stopped touring widely. He continued to release recordings, if sporadically, including with the progressive folk group Ti Ti Chickapea. In 2008, he was again touring and performing regularly, releasing Green (with Jim Black and Marc Ducret) on Winter & Winter, Stefan F. Winters subsequent label to JMT. In December 2011, Winter & Winter released Roberts' Everything Is Alive, as well as re-releasing his entire JMT catalogue.

Selected discography

As leader 
 Black Pastels (JMT, 1987)
 Birds of Prey (JMT, 1990)
 Little Motor People (JMT, 1993)
 22 Years from Now (Level Green, 1997)
 I'll Always Remember (Level Green, 1998)
 Cause and Reflect (Level Green, 1998)
 The Truth and Reconciliation Show (I Town, 2002)
 Green (Winter & Winter, 2008) with Marc Ducret and Jim Black
 Everything Is Alive (Winter & Winter, 2011) with Bill Frisell, Jerome Harris and Kenny Wollesen
 Science of Love (Sunnyside, 2021) with Hank Roberts Sextet 

With Arcado String Trio
 Arcado (JMT, 1989)
 Behind the Myth (JMT, 1990)
 For Three Strings and Orchestra (JMT, 1992)

With Miniature
 Miniature (JMT, 1989)
 I Can't Put My Finger on It (JMT, 1992)

As sideman 
With Tim Berne
 Fulton Street Maul (CBS, 1986)
 Sanctified Dreams (Columbia, 1988)
 Tim Berne's Fractured Fairy Tales (JMT, 1989)
 Diminutive Mysteries (Mostly Hemphill) (JMT, 1993)

With Bill Frisell
 Lookout for Hope (ECM, 1987)
 Before We Were Born (Nonesuch, 1989)
 Where in the World (Nonesuch, 1991)
 Unspeakable (Nonesuch, 2004)
 Richter 858 (Songlines, 2005)
 History, Mystery (Nonesuch, 2008)
 Disfarmer (Nonesuch, 2009)
 Sign of Life: Music for 858 Quartet (Savoy, 2011)
 Big Sur (Okeh, 2013)
 Harmony (Blue Note records, 2019)

With Alex Cline
 The Lamp and the Star (ECM, 1987)

With Marilyn Crispell
 Santuerio (1993)

With Ti Ti Chickapea
 Change of Worlds (2000)
 Firestick (2002)

With Edmar Casteñeda
 Cuarto de Colores (2006)

With Buffalo Collision
 Duck (Screwgun, 2008)

With Donald Rubinstein
 Martin (Motion Picture Soundtrack) (Varèse Sarabande, 1978)
 When She Kisses the Ship on His Arm (Bare Bones, 2009)

References

External links
 

1954 births
Living people
American jazz cellists
American male jazz musicians
Musicians from Indiana
Arcado String Trio members
JMT Records artists